Woodside is a neighborhood located in the Montgomery County, Maryland, area of Silver Spring. Founded in 1889, it is the oldest neighborhood in Silver Spring.

Location
Woodside's boundaries are roughly Georgia Avenue (State Route 97) on the east, Spring Street to the South, 16th Street (State Route 390) to the north and the Red Line (Washington Metro) to the west. It borders the neighborhoods of Woodside Park and North Woodside. It also shares a boundary with the Silver Spring business district. The neighborhood was developed at the same time as other communities along the B&O Metropolitan Branch (i.e. Takoma Park, Kensington, and Garrett Park).

Landmarks
Woodside Urban Park is a 2.3-acre recreational park located on the southern edge of the neighborhood. The park was renovated and expanded in 2010 and contains picnic tables, a large children's play area, tennis courts, a bronze statue of a man on a unicycle, and a water fountain that provides a soothing counterpoint to busy Georgia Avenue.  Also contained within the boundaries of the neighborhood are the Woodside United Methodist Church, part of the Silver Spring Cooperative Parish, and the Montgomery County Health and Human Services building.  The DHHS building occupies the site and the renovated building of the former Woodside Elementary School.

History
Sligo Village Methodist Church (later renamed Woodside United Methodist Church before merging with a United Methodist congregation to form Silver Spring United Methodist Church in 2014) was built on a plot of land donated in 1872 by a local farmer. Due to dangerously close location of the Washington Woodside and Forest Glen Railway, and a desire to be closer to the newly opened Woodside community, the congregation decided to move the building. The church was placed on rollers and pulled by a team of horses to the corner of Spring Street and Georgia Avenue. Following the sale of that property in 1963, the congregation built its present location on the last large, undeveloped parcel in Woodside in 1964.

Woodside is home to an Orthodox Jewish community, centered around the Woodside Synagogue Ahavas Torah (WSAT) located on Georgia Avenue. The Woodside Synagogue is an Orthodox synagogue dating from 1974. All of the Woodside neighborhood is located within the Shepherd Park/Woodside Community Eruv, which encompasses most of incorporated Silver Spring and parts of Northwest DC.

Goldberg's Bagels is a kosher Jewish bagel shop located on Georgia Avenue in Woodside. The Woodside neighborhood was formerly the main location for the Woodside Deli, a kosher style delicatessen that served traditional Ashkenazi Jewish staples. The Woodside Deli closed in 2019, though the Rockville location remains in operation.

Transportation
Washington Metro service is available on the Red Line at the nearby Forest Glen and Silver Spring stations. Woodside is served by Metrobus numbers Y2, Y8, Q2, and Q4. The future Woodside station on the Purple Line will be built in Woodside on 16th Street and is expected to be open to the public by 2022.

See also
Metropolitan Branch Trail

References

External links

Ashkenazi Jewish culture in Maryland
Jewish communities in the United States
Jews and Judaism in Silver Spring, Maryland
Neighborhoods in Montgomery County, Maryland
Orthodox Jewish communities
Orthodox Judaism in Maryland
Silver Spring, Maryland (CDP)